Richfield is a town in Stanly County, North Carolina, United States.  The town was originally called "Ritchie's Field," for the prominent Ritchie family who established the post office, sawmill, and streets of the settlement.

Geography 
Richfield is located at  (35.471664, -80.256454).

Richfield is located at the junction of US Route 52 and State Highway 49.

Demographics

2020 census

As of the 2020 United States census, there were 582 people, 196 households, and 148 families residing in the town.

2000 census
At the 2000 census, there were 515 people, 197 households and 144 families residing in the town. The population density was 247.0 per square mile (95.6/km). There were 225 housing units at an average density of 107.9 per square mile (41.8/km). The racial makeup of the town was 81.94% White, 14.37% African American, 2.14% Asian, 0.19% Pacific Islander, and 1.36% from two or more races. Hispanic or Latino of any race were 0.19% of the population.

There were 197 households, of which 34.0% had children under the age of 18 living with them, 56.9% were married couples living together, 12.2% had a female householder with no husband present, and 26.9% were non-families. 23.9% of all households were made up of individuals, and 9.1% had someone living alone who was 65 years of age or older.  The average household size was 2.61 and the average family size was 3.13.

27.4% of the population were under the age of 18, 6.4% from 18 to 24, 29.7% from 25 to 44, 25.6% from 45 to 64, and 10.9% who were 65 years of age or older. The median age was 36 years. For every 100 females, there were 100.4 males. For every 100 females age 18 and over, there were 102.2 males.

The median household income was $40,083 and the family median income was $41,442. Males had a median income of $26,420 compared with $23,542 for females. The per capita income for the town was $15,334. About 4.7% of families and 5.7% of the population were below the poverty line, including 4.4% of those under age 18 and 12.1% of those age 65 or over.

Government 
Richfield is governed by a mayor and town council system. Floyd Wilson was re-elected mayor on November 5, 2013, replacing Jim Misenheimer, long time mayor pro-tem Terry Deese became mayor June 2016 with the passing of Floyd Wilson. Former mayors include Terry Almond and Wade Barbee.

References

Towns in Stanly County, North Carolina
Towns in North Carolina